Rudolf Martin (born 31 July 1967) is a German actor working mainly in the United States. He first appeared in off-Broadway productions and then moved on to extensive TV and film work. He has made guest appearances on numerous hit television series and recently started working in Germany as well. He currently resides in Los Angeles.

Early life and education
Martin was born in West Berlin and spent his early years traveling throughout Europe while completing his education. Because of his interest in the arts, Martin studied American and English literature in Berlin and drama in Paris. He then enrolled in the Lee Strasberg Theatre Institute in New York City to pursue acting. While performing in small theatre productions, Martin secured a starring role in Susan Seidelman's Academy Award-nominated short film The Dutch Master. This was followed by leading roles on ABC's All My Children and Off-Broadway in Nicky Silver's critically acclaimed hit comedy The Food Chain. While in New York, Martin received recognition for his work in independent films such as Fall, High Art and When.

Career
After arriving in Los Angeles in 1999, he appeared in the Warner Brothers thriller Swordfish starring John Travolta, Hugh Jackman, Halle Berry and Don Cheadle. In the film Martin plays Axl Torvalds, an internationally renowned computer hacker who leads FBI agents on the trail of a criminal mastermind. Based on his performance in Swordfish, Martin was offered a role in the German thriller Soundless.

Before Swordfish Martin played a role in the original Showtime series Beggars and Choosers, an inside look at the television networks developed by Peter Lefcourt and Brandon Tartikoff that was popular within the entertainment industry. Martin played "Nikolai Krasnakov", the charming but dangerous Russian mobster whose life was to be developed into a mini-series by the fictional network. Martin played the exuberant young mobster for the entire two seasons.

Martin then moved to Hollywood and has since appeared in the 20th Century Fox's comedy Bedazzled, the Warner Brothers film White Oleander, Patrik Ian Polk’s edgy comedy Punks that was nominated for an Independent Spirit Award, as well as in the independent feature The Scoundrel's Wife, starring Tatum O'Neal, Tim Curry and Julian Sands.

Martin portrayed the title character Vlad Dracula in the USA film Dark Prince: The True Story of Dracula. The film was shot in 2000 on authentic locations in Romania and tells the story of Prince Vlad III Dracula, "the Impaler" (1431–1476), who inspired the name of Bram Stoker's fictional vampire count. Peter Weller, Jane March and Roger Daltrey co-starred in Dark Prince, which premiered in October 2000. Martin then guest-starred as the fictional Count Dracula on the fifth season premiere of Buffy the Vampire Slayer ("Buffy vs. Dracula") alongside his previous All My Children co-star Sarah Michelle Gellar. Rudolf Martin proceeded to guest-star in five episodes of the Fox thriller 24 in which he played two different characters, one of them impersonating the other.

He has also guest starred in other television dramas, notably Judging Amy, Crossing Jordan and in CSI: Crime Scene Investigation as a serial killer motivated by Shakespearean sonnets, as well as Mossad agent Ari Haswari, the antagonist to Mark Harmon on the hit show NCIS for seasons 1–2 until that character's violent death. Also released is the independent feature film River's End, shot on location in Texas.

Martin's main focus remains on working in film; as a European actor he continues to appear in European productions as well. He had his second lead performance in the film: Bloodlines, the story of a young man coming to terms with his newly discovered family in Slovakia. Bloodlines was shot in San Francisco and Slovakia in 2003.

He is cast member in Hoboken Hollow, an independent feature with C. Thomas Howell, Dennis Hopper and Michael Madsen and in another German feature, Paparazzo shooting in France and Spain. In Stargate SG-1 he had a guest appearance in the episode "Company of Thieves" in Season 10 as Anateo of the Lucian Alliance. He also has a guest appearance in three episodes of Dexter as drug lord Carlos Guerrero. Currently (as of 2006) completed is Last Exit and Hyenas and the short movie Sunrise.

In 2011 he played the character of Tormento Lancie in the video interludes for Britney Spears' Femme Fatale Tour. Martin's character is a stalker set out to eliminate Spears as the Femme Fatale.

Filmography

Film

 The Dutch Master (1993, Short) (Susan Seidelman) - Dutch Man with Pipe
 Run for Cover (1995) - Mr. Spengel
 Café Babel (1995, Short) - Lover (he)
 Tales of Erotica (1996) - (segment "The Dutch Master")
 Fall (1997) - Phillipe
 High Art (1998) - Dieter
 When (1999) - Alain
 Watershed (1999) - Richard Petrovic
 Punks (2000) - Gilbert
 Bedazzled (2000) - Raoul
 Swordfish (2001) - Axl Torvalds
 The Scoundrel's Wife (a.k.a. Home Front) (2002) - Neg Picou
 Soundless (2004, German Movie) - Der junge Polizist
 Bloodlines (2004) - Martin
 River's End (2005) - Alejandro
 Hoboken Hollow (2006) - Howie Beale
 Two Nights (2007, Short) - Frank
 Last Exit (2008)
 The Hitchhiking Game (2008, Short) - Man
 Sunrise (2008)
 Raven (2009) - Lazar
 Pig (2011) - Man
 Hyenas (2011) - Sheriff Manfred
 The Stand-In (2011, Short) - Jan De Groot
 The Collector (2012, Short) - Francis
 Taking Capellera (2012) - Volden
 Bela Kiss (2012) - Bela Kiss
 3 Holes and a Smoking Gun (2014) - Junkie
 Near Myth: The Oskar Knight Story (2016) - Himself
 Fucking Berlin (2016) - Dr. Carl Brenner
 Crossing (2019) - Andrei
 Ford v Ferrari (2019) - Dieter Voss

Television
 All My Children (1994-1995) - Anton Lang
 Sliders (1999) - Kurtz
 Beggars and Choosers (1999-2001) - Nicky Krasnakov
 Buffy the Vampire Slayer (2000) - Dracula
 Dark Prince: The True Story of Dracula (2000, TV Movie) - Vlad Dracula the Impaler
 24 (2001-2002) - Jonathan Matijevich / Martin Belkin
 Star Trek: Enterprise (2002, Episode: "Two Days and Two Nights") - Ravis
 Judging Amy (2003) - Cell Phone Imbecile
 CSI: Crime Scene Investigation (2003) - Cameron Klinefeld
 CSI: Miami (2004) - Rudy
 NCIS (2004-2012) - Ari Haswari
 Crossing Jordan (2005) - Albie Samson
 Stargate SG-1 (2006) - Anateo
 Dexter (2006) - Carlos Guerrero
 Paparazzo (2007, German TV movie) - Raoul
 Moonlight (2007) - Christian Ellis
 Mad Men (2008) - Christian
 Heisse Spur (Cry No More) (2009, German TV Movie) - True Gallagher
  (2010, German TV Movie) - Johannes Erlanger
 Nikita (2011) - Gustav
 Borgia (2011) - Francheschetto Cibo
 The Mentalist (2012) - Brox Marck
 S.W.A.T (2017) - Jürgen Richter

External links

1967 births
Male actors from Berlin
German expatriates in the United States
Living people
German expatriate male actors in the United States
German male stage actors
German male film actors
German male television actors